Yu Pui Hong (born 7 February 1995) is a Hong Kong professional footballer who plays as a left back for Hong Kong Premier League club Lee Man.

Career
On 3 July 2017, Lee Man announced that they had signed Yu to a contract.

References

External links

Yu Pui Hong at HKFA

1995 births
Living people
Hong Kong footballers
Association football defenders
Eastern Sports Club footballers
Dreams Sports Club players
Lee Man FC players
Hong Kong Premier League players